B.T. Express (originally named Brooklyn Transit Express) was an American funk/disco group that had a number of successful songs during the 1970s.

Background
According to a Record World article in March, 1975, the King Davis House Rockers begat the Madison Street Express which begat Brothers Trucking which begat B.T. Express. At the time, the group consisted of Rich Thompson on lead guitar and Bill Risbrook on tenor saxophone who were the nucleus of King House Rockers. Also in the group were Louis Risbrook on bass who was the brother of Bill on solo flute, alto sax, piccolo and clarinet. There was also Olando T. Woods on drums and singer Barbara Joyce Lomas. The latest member was Dennis Rowe on congas. Carlos Wards who was born in Panama had played with the John Coltrane Octet, Don Cherry, Pharoah Sanders, and McCoy Tyner. Barbara Joyce Lomas who came from Alabama had been with the Uptights and sang on their single, "Free at Last" b/w "You Git’s None of This", released on Skye Records SKYE 4525.

Beginnings
The group was part of the "Brooklyn sound" of the early 1970s, formed from three players of the group King Davis House Rockers.  The House Rockers were a local dance band who had released a couple of obscure singles (1967's "We All Make Mistakes Sometimes" on Verve Records, 1972's "Rum Punch") 

The single, "Baby You Satisfy Me" b/w "We All Make Mistakes Sometimes" was credited to King Davis House Rockers featuring Richard Thomas, and was released on Verve VK 10492 in February 1967. In 1969, the King Davis produced "What Do I Have to Do" b/w "We All Make Mistakes Sometimes", credited to Rick Thompson was released on Columbia 4-44880. There was also a single by The Visitors, "Holiday in Love" b/w "Rum Punch" which was released on Airways LK-2000. It was composed by L. Risbrook, C. Ward and C. Stephenson. It was co-produced by Stephenson and King Davis. It was also released on Straker's Records S-0046 with "Rum Punch" as the A side.

The three players (guitarist Richard Thompson, tenor sax player Bill Risbrook, and alto sax player Carlos Ward) formed Madison Street Express along with bassist Louis Risbrook (later Muslim-monickered Jamal Rasool), percussionist Dennis Rowe, drummer Terrell Wood, and vocalist Barbara Wood.

Career
The members of Madison Street Express along with producer Jeff Lane signed with production company Roadshow Records to record writer Billy Nichols's "Do It ('Til You're Satisfied)". The record was shopped around to major labels until it was accepted at Scepter Records. Scepter suggested the group change its name from Madison Street Express, hence the Brooklyn Transit Express. The single was released in August 1974, and reached the top 10. Lane took the group back into the studios at that point to record a second single and pitch a full album to the label. Scepter agreed to the LP and to Roadshow Records having its own label within Scepter Records.

The first two singles were hits, both number 1 R&B releases and both Top 5 pop singles in the US. The album hit number 1 on the R&B album chart and number 5 on the Pop album chart of the US. These recordings were also hits in the spreading disco culture, "Do It" peaking on club playlists before Billboard started a separate disco chart, but the follow-up single sat for five weeks at number 1. They were certified gold releases.

BT Express released an album per year through 1978. With the third album, Leslie Ming was brought in as drummer and Michael Jones was added as keyboardist. Jamal, who had converted to Islam, gave Jones the name Kashif Saleem, which he used after departing the group, in 1979, to pursue producing ("Mighty M Productions" with Morrie Brown and Paul Laurence Jones) and solo recording ventures. That year, songwriter Billy Nichols and drummer Leslie Ming also departed the group. In 1976 Scepter records was experiencing business difficulties that soon ended the company, and BT Express was given a distribution deal with Columbia Records, which, though it gave them greater exposure, resulted in less attention being paid to their production, since they had so many acts to concentrate on. The group did not achieve the level of radio or sales success on Columbia that they had on the more nurturing but by-then defunct Scepter. They stayed with Columbia for five years, with Lane producing through 1978, then Nichols producing their fifth album before he departed for solo work, and Morrie Brown producing the sixth LP and several follow-up tracks. The group switched labels to Coast To Coast Records for the 1982 LP, to Earthtone Records for a later 1982 single, and to manager King Davis' own label in 1985.

Michael Jones, later known as Kashif died at his home in the Playa del Rey neighborhood of Los Angeles, on September 25, 2016, at age 59.

Members

Original lineup
 Richard “Rick” Thompson - guitar, vocals
 Bill Risbrook - tenor saxophone, flute, vocals 
 Terrell Wood - drums
 Barbara Joyce Lomas - vocals
 Carlos Ward - alto sax, flute, piccolo, woodwind
 Dennis Rowe - percussion
 Louis Risbrook (later known as Jamal Rasool) - bass, vocals

Discography

Chart history

Studio albums

Singles

See also
 List of artists who reached number one on the U.S. dance chart

References

External links
 
 
 [ Billboard chart history for B.T. Express]

American dance music groups
American funk musical groups
American soul musical groups
Columbia Records artists
Scepter Records artists
American disco groups